Fir Mountain is a hamlet in Saskatchewan, Canada.

Etymology

The Fir Mountain school was established in 1913. Local records indicate that Mrs. D. H. Blood, the first postmistress, named it after "her home in the United States", but there is no American community known by that name. Fir Mountain is more likely named after the nearby Wood Mountain hills, which are indeed forested.

In popular culture
 As part of the film series The Grasslands Project, A Rancher’s View describes raising cattle adjacent to Grasslands National Park where conservation of the Sage Grouse is a priority.

References

Unincorporated communities in Saskatchewan
Waverley No. 44, Saskatchewan
Division No. 3, Saskatchewan